Acleracra is a genus of moth in the family Cosmopterigidae. It contains only one species, Acleracra pancarphalea, which is found in New Guinea.

References

External links

Natural History Museum Lepidoptera genus database

Cosmopterigidae
Monotypic moth genera
Moths of New Guinea